The fastest motorcycle may refer to:
the fastest production motorcycles
the fastest production motorcycles by acceleration